Primula matthioli, synonym Cortusa matthioli, sometimes called alpine bells, is a flowering plant with a wide distribution in the Palearctic, both in Europe and in temperate Asia, from Siberia in the north to Afghanistan, Pakistan and China in the south.

Subspecies
Many subspecies are recognized. Some have been treated as separate species, particularly in the formerly accepted genus Cortusa.
Primula matthioli subsp. altaica (Losinsk.) Kovt., syn. Cortusa altaica
Primula matthioli subsp. brotheri (R.Knuth) Kovt., syns. Cortusa brotheri,  Primula brotheri
Primula matthioli subsp. discolor (Vorosch. & Gorovoj) Kovt., syn. Cortusa discolor
Primula matthioli subsp. himalaica (Losinsk.) Kovt., syn. Cortusa himalaica 
Primula matthioli subsp. matthioli , syns. Cortusa gradissima, Primula cortusa
Primula matthioli subsp. mongolica (Losinsk.) Kovt., syn. Cortusa mongolica
Primula matthioli subsp. pekinensis (V.A.Richt.) Kovt., syns. Cortusa coreana, Cortusa pekinensis, Primula coreana
Primula matthioli subsp. pubens (Schott, Nyman & Kotschy) Kovt., syn. Cortusa pubens
Primula matthioli subsp. sachalinensis (Losinsk.) Kovt., syns. Cortusa amurensis, Cortusa jozana, Cortusa sachalinensis
Primula matthioli subsp. sibirica (Andrz. ex Besser) Kovt., syns. Cortusa insularis, Cortusa jacutica, Cortusa sibirica
Primula matthioli subsp. turkestanica (Losinsk.) Kovt., syn. Cortusa turkestanica

References

External links
Cortusa matthioli
Cortusa matthioli

matthioli
Flora of Europe
Flora of temperate Asia
Flora of Pakistan
Plants described in 1753
Taxa named by Carl Linnaeus
Alpine flora